Jiangsu Dragons Kentier, also known as Jiangsu Dragons or Jiangsu Kentier, are a Chinese professional basketball team in the Southern Division of the Chinese Basketball Association, based in Nanjing, Jiangsu.

History 
In the 2004–05 season, the Jiangsu Dragons finished in last place in the South Division. Tristan Wells lead the team in points and defeated the Xinjiang Flying Tigers in the quarter-finals and the Yunnan Bulls in the semi-finals, but lost to the Guangdong Southern Tigers in the Finals.

Current roster

Seasons

Notable players 

  Hu Weidong (1985–2005)
  Hu Xuefeng (1999–2017)
  Chris Andersen (1999–2000)
  Alex Scales (2001–2002)
  Chris Herren (2003–2004)
  Yi Li (2004–present)
  Jelani McCoy (2004–2005)
  Brian Butch (2008)
  Donnell Harvey (2008–2009)
  Jameel Watkins (2008–2009)
  Ricky Davis (2010)
  Jérôme Moïso (2010–2011)
  Antoine Wright (2010–2011)
  Dan Gadzuric (2011)
  Mardy Collins (2011)
  Marcus Williams (2011–2012)
 / Jackson Vroman (2011–2012)
  Mike Harris (2012–2013)
  Garret Siler (2012–2013)
  Marcus Haislip (2013–2014)
  Toney Douglas (2014–2015)
  Chris Singleton (2014–2015)
  Arnett Moultrie (2014–2015)
  MarShon Brooks (2015–2018)
  Greg Oden (2015–2016)
  Will McDonald (2015, 2016–present)
  Samardo Samuels (2016–2017)
  Miroslav Raduljica (2017–present)
  Antonio Blakeney

References

External links 
 Club website at Sina.com.cn 

 

 
Basketball teams established in 1996
Chinese Basketball Association teams
Sport in Nanjing
1996 establishments in China